Devendra Nagpal  (born January 1, 1971) is an Indian politician and was the Member of Parliament of the 15th Lok Sabha of India. He represents the Amroha constituency of Uttar Pradesh and was a member of the Rashtriya Lok Dal political party.

Early life and education
Devendra Nagpal was born in Moradabad district in the state of Uttar Pradesh. He holds a graduate degree from K.G.K. PG College, Moradabad. By profession, Nagpal is a social worker.

Political career
Nagpal is a first time M.P. He succeeded Harish Nagpal who was an independent M.P. in the 14th Lok Sabha.
Prior to becoming M.P., Nagpal was also a member of Zila Panchayat and later a Member of Uttar Pradesh Legislative Assembly.

Expulsion from RLD
In June 2013, Nagpal along with another fellow M.P., Sarika Devendra Singh Baghel was expelled from Rashtriya Lok Dal by the party president Ajit Singh. They were expelled on account of anti-party activities. Ajit Singh had asked the two M.P.s to give clarification and also had stated that the party will move against them in the Lok Sabha under the anti-defection law.

Posts held

See also

15th Lok Sabha
Politics of India
Parliament of India
Government of India
Rashtriya Lok Dal
Amroha (Lok Sabha constituency)

References 

India MPs 2009–2014
1971 births
Rashtriya Lok Dal politicians
Lok Sabha members from Uttar Pradesh
Politicians from Moradabad
People from Amroha district
Living people
Members of the Uttar Pradesh Legislative Assembly
Bharatiya Janata Party politicians from Uttar Pradesh